Symphony of Living is a 1935 American film directed by Frank R. Strayer and starring Evelyn Brent.

Plot summary 
There is this old concertmaster of the Cosmopolitian Orchestra and he is about to realize his life-long ambition of appearing as a soloist with the orchestra, when an accident robs him of use of his right hand. His children, upon learning of his misfortune, immediately desert him knowing he will no longer provide them with money. So Adolph Greig sinks lower and lower and becomes a street beggar, too proud to ask for help from his friends and unable to find his son or daughter. One night, standing in front of the concert hall, he sinks to the street from hunger and fatigue. He is picked up by two men associated with the orchestra, Mancini and Rozzini, and they take him to Rozzini's and they develop a plan whereby they will set up Greig in a next-door studio where he can give violin lessons. A young violin genius named Carl Rupert shows up and, with the aid of Mancini and Rozzini, Greig starts the boy off on a brilliant career. Or, what promised to be a brilliant career until his long-lost mother shows up.

Cast 
Evelyn Brent as Paula Greig Rupert
Al Shean as Adolph Greig
Charles Judels as Rozzini
John Darrow as Richard Greig
Albert Conti as Mancini
Lester Lee as Carl Rupert
Gigi Parrish as Carmen Rozzini
Richard Tucker as Michael Rupert
John Harron as Herb Livingston
Ferike Boros as Mary Schultz
Ferdinand Schumann-Heink as The Doctor
Carl Stockdale as The Judge
William Worthington as Symphony Chairman
Leslie Goodwins as Oboe Player
Gregory Golubeff as Max - a Violinist
Demetrius Alexis as The Music Lover

References

External links 

1935 films
1935 drama films
American black-and-white films
Films directed by Frank R. Strayer
American drama films
Chesterfield Pictures films
1930s English-language films
1930s American films